Harold James Palmer (30 August 1890 – 12 February 1967) was an English cricketer who played first-class cricket as an amateur for Essex between 1924 and 1932. 

Palmer was educated at Loughton School in Essex and King's College London. He bowled leg-spin at medium-pace. His Essex teammate Charles Bray said he was "an excellent bowler – the nearest thing I've seen to Bill O'Reilly", but added that Palmer's fielding was unreliable, "particularly his catching". Palmer's best bowling figures came in Essex's victory over Gloucestershire in 1926, when he took 3 for 19 and 6 for 68. Opening the bowling for Essex against the Australians in 1930, he took 5 for 40 in the first innings.

References

1890 births
1967 deaths
People from Epping
English cricketers
Essex cricketers
Gentlemen cricketers
Marylebone Cricket Club cricketers
H. D. G. Leveson Gower's XI cricketers